Prelude to a Kiss is a 1958 concept album by Mel Tormé. The album charts the course of a relationship, where each track is interspersed with dialogue. The album was recorded in Los Angeles in November, 1957.

Track listing
 "Something to Live For" (Duke Ellington, Billy Strayhorn)
 "I'm Getting Sentimental Over You" (George Bassman, Ned Washington)
 "I Don't Stand a Ghost of a Chance With You" (Bing Crosby, Washington, Victor Young)
 "I Can't Believe That You're In Love With Me" (Clarence Gaskill, Jimmy McHugh)
 "Prelude to a Kiss" (Ellington, Mack Gordon, Irving Mills)
 "I've Got the World on a String" (Harold Arlen, Ted Koehler)
 "Between the Devil and the Deep Blue Sea" (Arlen, Koehler)
 "I Surrender Dear" (Harry Barris, Gordon Clifford)
 "I Let a Song Go Out of My Heart" (Ellington, Mills, Nemo)
 "Don't Worry 'bout Me" (Rube Bloom, Koehler)  	
 "One Morning in May" (Hoagy Carmichael, Mitchell Parish)
 "I Can't Give You Anything But Love" (Dorothy Fields, McHugh)

Personnel 
Mel Torme - Vocals
Marty Paich - Arranger, Conductor, Piano, Celesta
Don Fagerquist - Trumpet
Ronnie Lang - Alto-saxophone, Baritone-saxophone, Clarinet
Hynie Gunkler - Alto-saxophone and Clarinet
Bob Enevoldsen - Tenor-saxophone and Bass-clarinet
Vince DeRosa - French horn
Bill Pitman - Guitar
Joe Mondragon - Bass
Mel Lewis - Drums
Stella Castellucci - Harp

References

1958 albums
Mel Tormé albums
Albums conducted by Marty Paich
Albums arranged by Marty Paich
Concept albums